The LCDR B2 class was a class of 0-6-0 steam locomotives of the London, Chatham and Dover Railway. The class was designed by William Kirtley and introduced in 1891.

Ownership changes
The locomotives passed to the South Eastern and Chatham Railway in 1899. All 6 (LCDR nos. 652-657) survived into Southern Railway ownership in 1923. They had all been withdrawn by 1933.

References

B2
0-6-0 locomotives
Railway locomotives introduced in 1891
Scrapped locomotives
Standard gauge steam locomotives of Great Britain